Ekron may refer to:

Ekron, a city in Canaan, famous for its domination by the Philistines
Ekron, Kentucky, in the United States
The former name of Mazkeret Batya, Israel
Ekron (comics), a character in the works of DC Comics

See also
Akron, Ohio